Mamoru Iriguchi is a Japanese multimedia artist and theatre designer. He studied zoology at Kyoto University and then obtained an MA in Theatre Design from Nottingham Trent University. His designs include Mincemeat which won in the best design category at the Evening Standard Theatre Awards in 2009, and The Pink Bits, which won the Oxford Samuel Beckett Theatre Award in 2004.

References

External links
 Official website: http://www.iriguchi.co.uk/

Alumni of Nottingham Trent University
Japanese artists
Japanese scenic designers
Living people
Year of birth missing (living people)